In algebra, a Calabi–Yau algebra was introduced by Victor Ginzburg to transport the geometry of a Calabi–Yau manifold to noncommutative algebraic geometry.

References 

Algebra